Julio Nalundasan (July 21, 1894 – September 20, 1935) was a Filipino politician who was one of the political rivals of Ilocos Norte politician Mariano Marcos who was the father of Ferdinand Marcos (who later became the tenth President of the Philippines).

Nalundasan was killed by a sniper at his home in 1935, the day after beating Marcos for the second time in elections for the office of representative for the second district of Ilocos Norte. Mariano Marcos' son, Ferdinand, and brother-in-law, Quirino Lizardo, were later convicted for the murder. However, the conviction was overturned by the Supreme Court of the Philippines, through a decision by then Associate Justice Jose P. Laurel.

External links
G.R. No. L-47388 - the Supreme Court decision reversing Ferdinand Marcos' conviction for murder. Contains an official account of Nalundasan's assassination.

1894 births
1935 deaths
People from Batac
Ilocano people
Members of the House of Representatives of the Philippines from Ilocos Norte
Assassinated Filipino politicians
People murdered in the Philippines
Deaths by firearm in the Philippines
Members of the Philippine Legislature